Patín Alcodiam Salesiano (Valencian: Patí Alcodiam Salesià), more commonly known as Pas Alcoy or Enrile PAS Alcoy for sponsorship reasons, is a Spanish roller hockey team based in Alcoy, Valencian Community.

History
Founded in 1951 and integrated as the roller hockey section of the Real Alcodiam Deportivo, in 1957 merged with the Colegio Salesiano for creating the Patín Alcodiam Salesiano.

The team made its debut in the top tier in 1974 and made the debut in European Competition by playing the CERS Cup in the 2009–10 season. Its best European performance was in 2012, when the club qualified for the semifinals of the 2011–12 CERS Cup.

Season to season

Trophies
Copa Princesa de Asturias: 1
2014

References

External links
Official Facebook account

Spanish rink hockey clubs
Sports clubs established in 1951
1951 establishments in Spain
Sports teams in the Valencian Community
Alcoy